Soultrane is the fourth studio album by jazz musician John Coltrane, released in 1958 on Prestige Records, catalogue 7142. It was recorded at the studio of Rudy Van Gelder in Hackensack, New Jersey, three days after a Columbia Records session for Miles Davis and the Milestones album.

Content
The album is a showcase for Coltrane's late-1950s "sheets of sound" style, the term itself coined by critic Ira Gitler in the album's liner notes. Also featured is a long reading of Billy Eckstine's ballad standard "I Want to Talk About You", which Coltrane would revisit often, including a version on the album Live at Birdland. Among the other tracks are "Good Bait" by Tadd Dameron, and Fred Lacey's "Theme for Ernie". "You Say You Care" is from the Broadway production of Gentlemen Prefer Blondes.

The album closes with a frenetic version of Irving Berlin's "Russian Lullaby". Producer Bob Weinstock relates Coltrane's humorous interpretation:
We were doing a session and we were hung for a tune and I said, "Trane, why don't you think up some old standard?" He said, "OK I got it.["]...and they played "Russian Lullaby" at a real fast tempo. At the end I asked, "Trane, what was the name of that tune?" And he said, "Rushin' Lullaby". I cracked up.

Soultrane takes its title from a song on a 1956 album by Tadd Dameron featuring Coltrane, Mating Call. "Soultrane" does not appear on this Soultrane, and none of the five tunes on Soultrane is an original by Coltrane. The song "Theme for Ernie" was featured on the soundtrack for the 2005 film Hollywoodland.

Track listing

Side one

Side two

Personnel
 John Coltrane – tenor saxophone
 Red Garland – piano
 Paul Chambers – bass
 Art Taylor – drums

Production personnel
 Rudy Van Gelder – engineering, remastering
 Shigeo Miyamoto – engineering, mastering
 Alan Yoshida, Steve Hoffman – mastering
 Del Costello, Bob Weinstock – production
 Kazue Sugimoto – supervision
 Akira Taguchi – supervision
 Ira Gitler – liner notes

References

1958 albums
John Coltrane albums
Prestige Records albums
Albums produced by Bob Weinstock